Ecliptoides is a genus of beetles in the family Cerambycidae, containing the following species:

 Ecliptoides azadi (Tavakilian & Peñaherrera-Leiva, 2003)
 Ecliptoides hovorei (Tavakilian & Peñaherrera-Leiva, 2003)
 Ecliptoides julietae Clarke, 2009
 Ecliptoides rouperti (Tavakilian & Peñaherrera-Leiva, 2005)
 Ecliptoides titoi Clarke, 2009
 Ecliptoides vargasi Clarke, 2009

References

Rhinotragini